Hasan Küçükakyüz (born November 11, 1957) is a retired four-star Turkish Armed Forces general. He was the 32nd Commander of the Turkish Air Force and retired by the decision of the Supreme Military Council dated August 4, 2022.

References

 

1957 births
Living people
Turkish Air Force generals
Commanders of the Turkish Air Force
People from Trabzon